Joshua Jamal Miller (born May 3, 1996) is an American gridiron football defensive back for the Winnipeg Blue Bombers of the Canadian Football League (CFL). He played college football at Ball State and Marian University (Indiana).

Professional career

Detroit Lions 
After going undrafted, Miller signed with the Detroit Lions of the National Football League (NFL) on April 30, 2019. He did not make the final roster.

Winnipeg Blue Bombers 
Miller signed with the Winnipeg Blue Bombers on February 14, 2020. However, he did not play in 2020 due to the cancellation of the 2020 CFL season. Following training camp in 2021, he made the team's active roster and played in his first professional game on August 5, 2021 against the Hamilton Tiger-Cats. Following a loss to the Toronto Argonauts in week 3, Miller was demoted to the practice roster and did not play again in the regular season. However, he was re-activated for the 108th Grey Cup game and won his first Grey Cup championship over the Hamilton Tiger-Cats.

References

External links 
 Winnipeg Blue Bombers profile
 Ball State Cardinals profile

1996 births
Living people
Players of American football from Indianapolis
Players of Canadian football from Indianapolis
American football cornerbacks
Canadian football defensive backs
Marian Knights football players
Ball State Cardinals football players
Detroit Lions players
Winnipeg Blue Bombers players